Tuv may refer to:

Organizations
Technischer Überwachungsverein (TÜV), a German organization that tests products to safety standards
Traditional Unionist Voice (TUV), a political party in Northern Ireland

Places
Töv Province in Mongolia
Tuv, village in Hemsedal, Buskerud, Norway

Other 

 Tuv, American YouTuber and Musician from Hawthorne, California.